The Fiat Idea is a car manufactured and marketed by Fiat from 2003 to 2012 over a single generation with one intermediate facelift. It has a five-door, five passenger, front-engine, front-wheel drive, high-roof mini MPV design.

Internally designated the Type 350, the Idea was Fiat's first entry in the compact MPV market, sharing its platform with the second-generation Fiat Punto (Project 188); exterior design by Fabrizio Giugiaro at Italdesign and interior design by Fiat's Centro Stilo. The monovolume design is noted for its centrally located instrument cluster, and high H-point, reconfigurable seating — with reclining, sliding and folding rear seating. 

The Idea debuted at the 2003 Geneva International Motor Show, followed a year later by an upscale variant, the Lancia Musa, sharing many common components with modified exterior.  Both were manufactured at Fiat's Mirafiori plant and were superseded by the Fiat 500L. Production continued through MY 2016 in Brazil, including the Adventure model, a front-drive variant with increased ground clearance, and styling elements resembling an off-road vehicle.

The Idea nameplate is an acronym for Intelligent Design Emotive Architecture.

Design

The Idea was conceived as a compact, mono volume MPV — i.e., to integrate the handling and compact size of a B-segment car under four meters in length with the increased height, flexible seating, cargo configurability and versatility of an MPV. 

The Idea's rear seats combine 40:20:40 split/folding and 60-degree-reclining backrests with a 60:40 split, folding and sliding seat base — the rear seats slide forward or rearward to prioritize cargo or passenger space, recline for comfort lounging, as well as fold and tumble for maximum cargo. The front passenger seat folds flat to receive tall items and 25 storage compartments are distributed throughout the cabin. The Idea's seating was designed using biometric principles developed by Antonio Dal Monte at the Italian National Olympic Committee's sport medicine institute.

Standard features included six airbags, Isofix attachments, automatic door locks, fire prevention system (fuel pump inertia cut off switch and in-tank fuel cut off; plastic fuel tank resistant to mechanical stress and fire; maxifuse-equipped electrical power leads to cut off power supply at high temperature; protectively located starter motor and alternator connections  with abrasion‐proof coatings; and fire-resistant interior trim), ABS braking with brake force distribution, and anti-slip regulation system to limit wheel slip in cases of reduced grip, traction control, electronic stability control, hill-holder, electric speed-sensitive power steering system,  0-20-40 split rear seating, and a headlight delay system marketed as Follow Me Home.

Optional features included a panoramic sunroof, parking sensors, and dual-zone climate control.

Engines
The Fiat Idea engines are all Euro 4 compliant. All of these engines can be matched with a clutchless 5-speed sequential manual shift with a selectable, fully automatic mode — as an automated manual gearbox marketed as Dualogic.

Brazil
The Brazilian version of the Idea was launched in late 2005. The engines available are the new 1.4-litre 8-valve  Fire engine (the same as in the Grande Punto) and the latest version of the GM-sourced Powertrain 1.8-litre 8-valve  engine. Both have flexible fuel technology, which lets the driver use either gasoline or ethanol.

This version has increased height compared to the European version. The dashboard derives from the Fiat Palio Mk. III, and adapted to the Fiat Idea. Options include a panoramic glass roof as an option, marketed as the SkyDome.

The Idea is exported in two different trim levels (the ELX with the 1.4-liter engine and the HLX with the 1.8 engine) and it has four airbags, anti-lock braking system with EBD; parking, rain and lights sensor, security laminated glass, the SkyDome, 15" alloys, Bluetooth phone system, and leather seats among other features.

In 2010, the Idea received a major facelift with a new front, rear, and door handle.

Over 265,000 Ideas have been sold in Brazil.

Idea Adventure
The Idea Adventure is a mini crossover version launched in September 2006 in São Paulo, Brazil. Chiefly featuring cosmetic revisions to the Idea, the Adventure has a revised suspension, tires are Pirelli Scorpion 205/70 R15, a body moldings, 15" alloys, interior mods like the white instruments, and standard safety equipment which features double front and side airbags, ABS brakes with EBD. In 2009, the entire Adventure line (Idea, Doblò, Strada and Palio Weekend) was equipped with a locking differential. The line was rebadged as Adventure Locker.

References

External links

Idea
Italdesign vehicles
Euro NCAP small MPVs
Mini MPVs
Compact MPVs
2010s cars
Front-wheel-drive vehicles
Cars introduced in 2003
Flexible-fuel vehicles
Cars of Brazil